Gothenburg Airport can refer to one of three airports in or near Gothenburg, Sweden:   

 Göteborg Landvetter Airport, the largest of the three and Gothenburg's only current international airport
 Gothenburg City Airport, closed to large passenger aircraft since 2015, but used by business jets and general aviation
 Torslanda Airport, in the nearby town of Torslanda; served as Gothenburg's primary airport 1923–1977